High Pockets is a 1919 American silent Western film directed by Ira M. Lowry and starring Louis Bennison, Katherine MacDonald, William Black, Frank Evans, and Edward Roseman. It is based on a novel of the same name by William Patterson White. The film was released by Goldwyn Pictures on August 15, 1919.

Plot

Cast
 Louis Bennison as 'High Pockets' Henderson
 Katherine MacDonald as Joy Blythe
 William Black as Jim Stute
 Frank Evans as Bull Bellows
 Edward Roseman as Max Manon
 Francis Joyner as Tony
 Sam J. Ryan as Mike Flynn (as Sam Ryan)
 Neil Moran as Henry Allison

Preservation
A print of High Pockets survives at the Museum of Modern Art.

References

External links

 
 

1919 Western (genre) films
1919 films
American black-and-white films
Goldwyn Pictures films
Films based on American novels
Silent American Western (genre) films
1910s American films
1910s English-language films